This is an incomplete list of earthquakes in Armenia.

See also
Geology of Armenia

References

 List
Armenia
Earthquakes